Peruth Chemutai (born July 10, 1999) is a Ugandan steeplechase runner. She won the gold medal in the women's 3000 metres steeplechase at the 2020 Summer Olympics in Tokyo, becoming the first Ugandan woman ever to win an Olympic medal.

Chemutai is the Ugandan record holder for the 3000 m steeplechase and 5 kilometres road race.

Career
Hailing from the Bukwo District, she took up running in 2013 after attending the District Athletics Championships in Bukwo as a casual fan. At the 2015 Commonwealth Youth Games in Apia, she won silver medals in the 1500 metres and 3000 metres.

In 2016, the 17-year-old finished in seventh place in the final of the women's 3000 m steeplechase event at the 2016 IAAF World U20 Championships held in Bydgoszcz, Poland.

At the 2016 Summer Olympics in Rio de Janeiro, her time of 9:31.03 in the heats did not qualify her for the final.

She also competed in the junior women's race at the 2017 IAAF World Cross Country Championships in Kampala, finishing in seventh place.

At the 2018 World U20 Championships held in mid-July, she claimed a notable silver medal in the 3000 m steeplechase. A week later, at the Monaco Diamond League, she set a national record with a time of 9:07.94.

In 2019, she competed in the senior women's race at the 2019 IAAF World Cross Country Championships held in Aarhus, Denmark. She finished in 5th place.

At the 2020 Tokyo Olympics, Chemutai competed in the 3000 m steeplechase. She beat pre-race favorites such as Beatrice Chepkoech and Hyvin Kiyeng Jepkemoi to finish with a time of 9:01.45, a national record, and win the gold medal. Chemutai became the first Ugandan woman ever to win an Olympic medal in any sport.

International competitions

References

External links
 

1999 births
Living people
Ugandan female steeplechase runners
Ugandan female cross country runners
Athletes (track and field) at the 2020 Summer Olympics
Medalists at the 2020 Summer Olympics
Olympic female steeplechase runners
Olympic gold medalists for Uganda
Olympic gold medalists in athletics (track and field)
Olympic athletes of Uganda
People from Bukwo District
Commonwealth Games bronze medallists for Uganda
Commonwealth Games medallists in athletics
Athletes (track and field) at the 2022 Commonwealth Games
Medallists at the 2022 Commonwealth Games
21st-century Ugandan women